The Ferrari 456 and 456M (Type F116) are front-engine grand tourers which were produced by Ferrari from 1992 to 2003. The 456 was a replacement for the front-engine 412 as the company's V12-powered four seater. The updated 456M, which was the last Ferrari model to use pop-up headlamps, was replaced in 2004 by the 612 Scaglietti.

456

Pietro Camardella designed the original 456 Grand Tourer at Pininfarina. It was available in GT and (from 1996) GTA models. The former has a six-speed manual, and the latter has a four-speed automatic developed in partnership with FF Developments, in Livonia, MI (which was later purchased by Ricardo Engineering in the UK.) The automatic transmission used in the 456 was the second and last conventional hydraulic automatic transmission with a torque converter to be offered by Ferrari. (The transmission found its latest use in the 400/412 series.) The 5.5 L (5,473.91 cc) 65° V12 engine was derived from the Dino V6 rather than the more conventional 60° V12s used in the 412 and Daytona. Acceleration from 0- takes 4.8 seconds, with a 13.3 second quarter-mile time. At the time of its development, it was the most powerful regular production road car ever developed by Ferrari. In 1996, the engine management system changed to Motronic M5.2 management and the engine with the updated system given the F116C code.

The name 456 is derived from the fact that each cylinder displaces 456 cubic centimeters. This was the last Ferrari to use this naming convention until the 488 GTB. Despite its exceptional performance, the 456 has a relatively unstressed engine, which has proven to be a very reliable unit. A further developed version of this engine was used in the front-engined 550 Maranello grand tourer that was introduced in 1996 and which became the most powerful naturally aspirated Ferrari road car aside from the 456.

The chassis is a tubular steel space-frame construction with a one-piece composite bonnet and body panels of aluminium. The body panels are welded to the chassis by using a special "sandwich filler" called feran that, when laid between, allows steel and aluminium to be welded. Pininfarina was responsible for the bodywork of the 456 until 1996 when production was moved to Ferrari. Total number of bodies made by Pininfarina amounts up to 1,435. All early cars have Pininfarina script and badge, whilst all Modificatas only have the disegno Pininfarina scripts.

456M

The 456M (M standing for Modificata) was unveiled in 1998, starting with chassis number 109589. Many changes were made to improve aerodynamics and cooling and the interior – still featuring Connolly Leather – was refreshed with new seats and other conveniences (fewer gauges on the dash, and a new Becker stereo fitted in front of the shifter rather than behind as in the very shallow and special Sony head unit in the 456 GT). The 456 had a smaller grille with fog lights outside the grille. The undercarriage spoiler on the 456M is fixed, where the older 456 had a motorised spoiler that began its deployment above . The bonnet was the first commercial application of carbon fibre, the previous being made of a composite material.

456 Bicolore Scaglietti
In the final year of production 2002/3, customers could specify their vehicle using the Carrozzeria Scaglietti Program. Launched at the 2002 Geneva Motor Show using Michael Schumacher's own 456M GT as an example, customers could work with Ferrari personnel to create a highly individual car. Schumacher's car had a two-colour paint scheme, custom leather interior, re-worked instruments, an uprated handling pack, and cross-drilled Brembo brakes. Such cars would be thus designated as a Tipo 456M GT(A) Scaglietti. The car is also known as the 456M GT "Schumacher Edition" as Schumacher was the first to commission the car. A total of 30 cars were produced, with only 10 being made with the 6-speed manual transmission.

Production
The total production of the 456 amounted to 3,289 units. These consisted of the following versions: 

456: 1,951 

456 GT: 1,548
 456 GTA: 403

456M: 1,338 

 456M GT: 688
 456M GTA: 650

Performance
The GTA can attain the same acceleration at 5.5 seconds. The Modificata models had the same performance statistics as their respective predecessors.

Car & Driver magazine test results for 1995 456 GT were:

Acceleration (seconds) : 0-: 4.8
Standing quarter-mile, sec/mph: 13.3/107 
Braking 70-0 mph: 170 ft
Lateral acceleration: 0.89 g

Road & Track magazine test results for the 1995 456 GT were:

 Acceleration: 0-: 5.1 seconds
 Standing quarter-mile: 13.4 seconds at 108.8 mph
 Braking 60-0 mph: 124 ft

Road & Track magazine test results for the 1997 456 GTA were:

 Acceleration: 0-: 5.1 seconds
 Standing quarter-mile: 13.6 seconds 103 mph
 Braking 60-0 mph: 120 ft
 Lateral acceleration: 0.93 g

Motor Trend magazine's test results for the 1997 456 GTA were:

Acceleration: 0-: 4.9 seconds
Standing quarter-mile: 13.3 seconds 105.2 mph
Braking 60-0 mph: 114 ft
Lateral acceleration: 0.88 g
Top Speed, 177 mph

Other body styles
While the 456 2+2 coupé was the only version offered to the general public, five other bodystyles were made on special request of specific customers:

 Ferrari 456 GT Saloon: At least three of these 4-door saloons (sedans) were built by Pininfarina especially for the Sultan of Brunei. 
 Ferrari 456 GT Venice: A series of seven 5-door estate (wagon) commissioned by Prince Jefri Bolkiah of Brunei. After Pininfarina designed and built them, the prince purchased six. It is unknown if the seventh car was purchased by a private car collector or if the remaining car was actually used as a development mule for testing. Each car is rumoured to have cost the Sultan's brother around US$1.5 million. The first Ferrari estate ever built.
 Ferrari 456 GT Spyder: A convertible version of the 456, of which two were built by Pininfarina specially for the Sultan of Brunei.
 Ferrari 456 GT Cabriolet: There are also three aftermarket conversions made by the R. Straman Company of Costa Mesa, California, one of which was purchased by boxer Mike Tyson.
 Ferrari 456 Targa: An aftermarket conversion done on a 456GTA once belonging to Shaquille O'Neal. Additional work included removal of the rear seats, to facilitate longer seat rails and a custom sound system.

Awards
The 5.5 L V12 engine used in the 456 won the "over 4-litre" class of the International Engine of the Year award for 2000 and 2001.

References

External links

 Official website
 What Does a Ferrari 456 GT V12 Sound Like?

456
Pininfarina
Grand tourers
Coupés
Rear-wheel-drive vehicles
2000s cars
Cars introduced in 1992